Proper speed may refer to:

Proper velocity
Proper motion

See also
Peculiar velocity